Assokolay is a rural locality (an aul) in Teuchezhsky District of the  Republic of Adygea, Russia. It is located southeast of Ponezhukay and has mostly Adyghe population.

External links
Unofficial website of Assokolay 
Youtube video about Assokolay 

Rural localities in Teuchezhsky District